Marxist socialism may refer to:
Marxism
Scientific socialism
Socialism (Marxism)